Aleksandr Nikolayevich Koshkin (13 June 1959 – 16 October 2012) was a Russian amateur light-middleweight boxer. After placing second at the 1980 Summer Olympics, he won a European title in 1981 and a world title in 1982. Koshkin typically kept a distance from the opponent and was known for his sudden knockouts.

As a child Koshkin trained in cross-country skiing, and changed to boxing at the age of 11, following his elder brother. He first trained at Spartak under Boris Grekov, who previously raised the Olympic medalist Sergei Sivko. In 1978 Koshkin was included to the Soviet national team. In the 1980 Olympic final he lost to Armando Martínez, but avenged the loss in the world championship final in 1982.

During his boxing career Koshkin fractured his hands 36 times. Hand injuries eventually forced him to retire in 1983 with a record of 180 wins out of 240 bouts. In retirement he coached boxers at Dynamo and later opened his own boxing school. He died aged 53 after suffering two strokes.

References

1959 births
2012 deaths
Light-middleweight boxers
Boxers at the 1980 Summer Olympics
Olympic boxers of the Soviet Union
Olympic silver medalists for the Soviet Union
Olympic medalists in boxing
Soviet male boxers
AIBA World Boxing Championships medalists
Medalists at the 1980 Summer Olympics
Honoured Masters of Sport of the USSR